Elena Vesnina was the defending champion, but lost in the third round to Angelique Kerber.

Naomi Osaka won her first WTA title, defeating Daria Kasatkina in the final, 6–3, 6–2. It was the first time two players under 21 had contested the finals since Kim Clijsters and Serena Williams in 2001. At 20 years old, Osaka was the youngest winner at the event since Ana Ivanovic in 2008, and at any Premier Mandatory event since Caroline Wozniacki at the 2010 China Open. She was also only the third unseeded player to win the tournament after Serena Williams (1999) and Clijsters (2005) and the first Japanese player to win a Premier Mandatory title.

Simona Halep and Wozniacki were in contention for the WTA no. 1 singles ranking at the beginning of the tournament. Halep retained the top ranking after Wozniacki lost in the fourth round.

Moreover, former no. 1 players Victoria Azarenka, Maria Sharapova and Serena Williams played in the same tournament for the first time since the 2016 Australian Open. This was Azarenka's first tournament since the 2017 Wimbledon Championships and Williams' first since the 2017 Australian Open. It was also Sharapova's first appearance at Indian Wells since 2015.

Seeds
All seeds received a bye into the second round.

Draw

Finals

Top half

Section 1

Section 2

Section 3

Section 4

Bottom half

Section 5

Section 6

Section 7

Section 8

Qualifying

Seeds

Qualifiers

Qualifying draw

First qualifier

Second qualifier

Third qualifier

Fourth qualifier

Fifth qualifier

Sixth qualifier

Seventh qualifier

Eighth qualifier

Ninth qualifier

Tenth qualifier

Eleventh qualifier

Twelfth qualifier

References
General

 Main Draw
 Qualifying Draw

Specific

Women's Singles